À la découverte de l'Aïd al-Adha (lit. "Let's discover Eid al-Adha") is a 2014 French documentary film directed by Farid Dms Debah.

Synopsis

Cast 
  as host
 Tariq Ramadan as contributor
 Nadia Yassine as contributor
 Joe Regenstein as contributor
 Hany Mansour Al Mazeedi as contributor
  as contributor
 Mohamed Bouberka as contributor
 Chakil Omarjee as contributor
 Fethallah Otmani as contributor

See also
 List of Islamic films

References

External links 
 

2014 documentary films
2014 films
French documentary films
2010s French-language films
Documentary films about Islam
2010s French films